Houston Blue: The Story of the Houston Police Department is a 2012 non-fiction book by Mitchel P. Roth and Tom Kennedy, published by the University of North Texas Press, chronicling the history of the Houston Police Department.

The first author, Roth, is a professor at Sam Houston State University and the second, Kennedy, at one time wrote newspaper articles for the Houston Post. The book was produced in a six year period after the Houston Police Officers' Union hired both authors in 2004. The authors conducted interviews numbering in the hundreds. In addition, the authors consulted archives as part of their research.

Reception

Brian D. Behnken of Iowa State University, in his review in The Journal of Southern History, criticized the book not having "a clear thesis" and a "lack of a consistent, critical, and analytical focus". He praised the inclusion of women and ethnic minority police officers and "some interesting facts". He particularly criticized how the authors support police unions but oppose other unions. He concluded that "Unfortunately, the book's weaknesses outweigh its strengths."

See also
 Convict Cowboys - Book written by Roth

References

External links
 Houston Blue: The Story of the Houston Police Department - University of North Texas Press
 Houston Blue available at Project MUSE

2012 non-fiction books
University of North Texas
Houston Police Department